Sundarbans South Wildlife Sanctuary is a reserve forest in Bangladesh that extends over an area of 36,970 hectares of mangrove forest.  It is situated next to the Sundarbans National Park in West Bengal, India.  The sanctuary is one of three Sundarbans wildlife sanctuaries, the others being the Sundarbans East Wildlife Sanctuary and the Sundarbans West Wildlife Sanctuary.

Flora
The Gewa (Euphorbiaceae) tree is the dominant woody species in the Sanctuary.  The other tree found abundantly is the Sundri (Heritiera fomes) tree.  In areas where the Sundri tree does not regenerate effectively a dense understory is artificially created to enable growth.

Environment
Salinity levels vary greatly between seasons.  This possibly represents an area of relatively longer duration of moderate salinity.

References

Sundarbans
Wildlife sanctuaries of Bangladesh
Forests of Bangladesh
Khulna Division
Protected areas with year of establishment missing